William B. Derrick (July 27, 1843 – April 15, 1913) was an African Methodist Episcopal (AME) bishop and missionary. He worked as a seaman early in his life and served in the Union Navy during the US Civil War. After the war, he joined the AME church and became involved in church leadership and missionary activities. He became a bishop of the church in 1896. He was also involved in Republican politics and civil rights.

Early life and naval service 
William B. Derrick was born on the Island of Antigua in the British West Indies July 27, 1843. His father, Thomas J. Derrick was from a large planter family on the island. He attended a public school at Gracefield run by Moravians from 1848 to 1856. He then went to a select private high school for three years. He trained to become a blacksmith. After this, he went to sea. He enlisted as a sailor from 1861 to 1864. and served on the Minnesota, the flagship of the North Atlantic Squadron, during the battle of the Merrimac and the Monitor. In his naval records he was described as being five feet five inches and having a tattoo of "W. B. D." on his right forearm.

Shortly after his service, he married Mary E. White, daughter of Edwin White. Mary died after a short marriage and he remarried Lillian M. Lillian around 1882 died in 1907. He remarried again in 1909 to Clara E. Henderson Jones.

AME church 

In 1866, he joined the AME church under John M. Brown who licensed him to preach and act as missionary agent, offices which he held until 1867. Bishop Daniel A. Payne appointed Derrick to Mt. Pisgah Chapel in Washington DC in 1867. In 1868, he was ordained deacon. He was then elected elder and ordained and made presiding elder of the Staunton church and district. He was elected presiding elder, pastor, and conference secretary at every Virginia Conference in the 1870s, and took part in general AME conferences in Nashville in 1872, Atlanta in 1876 and Baltimore in 1884. He was involved in a controversy in Virginia state politics in 1879 when he supported paying the state debt against others who favored readjusting the debts. He found himself on the losing end and resigned his charge in Virginia, touring the West Indies with his wife to return to ministry, then in New York State. He became presiding elder over a large district including New York, New Jersey, Pennsylvania, and New England. In 1888 he was elected missionary secretary.

In 1889, AME district bishop Benjamin Tucker Tanner was focused on missionary work in Haiti. In August, it was found that the mission treasury was empty. Derrick, as mission secretary was responsible and Payne demanded of Derrick what had happened to the funds. Derrick had been giving money to the Haitian mission in cash, which was not in itself a cause of trouble, but may have led to misuse of the funds. Tanner was hesitant to settle the dispute, but Derrick improved his place in the view of the AME leaders over the next few years and the pair reconciled.

In 1896 he was elected bishop, and served as bishop in the eighth, first, third, and fifteenth Episcopal districts. As bishop, Derrick played an important role in missionary activities in the church. In the 1900s, Derrick traveled to widely, and worked to expand the AME church in Africa.

Political and civil rights activism 
Outside of the church, Derrick was very active in politics. In June 1884 he was nominated a presidential elector-at-large for the Republican State Committees with the support of Cornelius Van Cott, but he declined after questions arose to his citizenship, although he had taken an oath and became a citizen when he enlisted in the navy 23 years earlier. Derrick purchased interest in the New York Globe from George Parker in November 1884 with a goal of making it a more thoroughly Republican paper. Derrick and co-editor T. Thomas Fortune disagreed over the direction of the paper and the paper entered default and was later resurrected by Fortune.

At the end of the century, Derrick was especially active in civil rights. Derrick was a member of the Afro-American Council a part of its organization by Fortune in 1897 in Chicago. Derrick in New York and Benjamin W. Arnett in Ohio were leaders of the AME Republicans in the late 1890s and early 1900s. Derrick supported licensed female preachers but not female ordained ministers. In September 1892, Derrick gave a speech at a meeting of Wong Chin Foo's Chinese Equal Rights League opposing the Geary Act.

Derrick was proud of his military service and supported numerous military and patriot causes. He was prominent among those who urged retaliation for the sinking of the Maine in 1898 which in part led to the Spanish–American War. Derrick was selected to deliver a sermon and prayer prior to the dedicatory address at the 1893 Grand Army of the Republic reunion at the dedication of the statue of Victory at the New York State monument at the Gettysburg Battlefield.

His sermons were reported in various newspapers. He was given a D. D. from Wilberforce University in 1885. He was friends with Bishop Richard H. Cain and served as executor of his will. He worked closely with James G. Blaine, Benjamin Harrison, and William McKinley. Derrick frequently traveled to England and was a popular speaker there.

Along with the Globe, at one point Derrick owned the journal, the West Indian Abroad. Derrick was affiliated with the Odd Fellows, Masons, Good Samaritans, and a trustee of Wilberforce University. He was a confidant and supporter of Booker T. Washington. He remained close to Antiguans in New York and in the West Indies throughout his life.

Derrick died April 15, 1913 in Flushing, New York.

References

External links 

1843 births
1913 deaths
Activists for African-American civil rights
Activists from New York City
African-American abolitionists
African-American Methodists
African Methodist Episcopal bishops
African Methodist Episcopal Church clergy
Antigua and Barbuda emigrants to the United States
Methodist abolitionists
New York (state) Republicans
Union Navy sailors
Wilberforce University
African-American United States Navy personnel